The Georgia State Railroad Museum (formerly the Roundhouse Railroad Museum) is a museum in Savannah, Georgia located at a historic Central of Georgia Railway site. It includes parts of the Central of Georgia Railway: Savannah Shops and Terminal Facilities National Historic Landmark District. The complex is considered the most complete antebellum railroad complex in the United States. The museum, located at 655 Louisville Road, is part of a historic district included in the National Register of Historic Places.

The museum is across the street from the Central of Georgia Depot and Trainshed, also part of the historic district. The complex was constructed in 1853 by the Central of Georgia Railway (CofG) before the outbreak of the American Civil War. Savannah Shops and terminal buildings were declared a National Historic Landmark in 1976, a listing which was expanded in 1978 to include additional buildings in the complex.

The historic railroad structures at the Georgia State Railroad Museum site include a partial roundhouse with operating turntable, partial machine shop, Tender Frame Shop, Blacksmith Shop, Boiler House, Storehouse & Print Shop, Lumber and Planing Sheds, Coach and Paint Shops, and a partial Carpentry Shop which now houses Savannah Children's Museum. Many of these structures are open for visitors to explore.

Description
The Historic Railroad Shops complex is among the finest remaining examples of Victorian railroad architecture and design and is the most intact antebellum railroad repair complex in the country. It was designated a National Historic Landmark by the National Park Service. On-site displays include antique shaft driven machinery, locomotives and railroad stock, model train layouts, an operating turntable, and the oldest portable steam engine in the United States. The Historic Railroad Shops offers a valuable educational experience for students and has also become a popular local tourist attraction.

The complex has been maintained as the Georgia State Railroad Museum and a general industry museum by the Coastal Heritage Society with the assistance of the City of Savannah.

Site history
The Central of Georgia Railroad started as the Central Rail Road and Canal Company in 1833, and built a passenger station, freight terminal and some shops in the Louisville Road area of Savannah around 1836. However, none of those structures remain today. The first completed building was the carpenters' shop in 1853, followed by the original roundhouse, machine shop, tender frame shop, blacksmith shop and several other buildings in 1855. Additional buildings were constructed at the complex into the 1920s.

The roundhouse, turntable and other structures were rebuilt in the late 1920s after a major fire in 1923, as well as to accommodate larger locomotives and rolling stock. Passenger trains operated to the Central of Georgia Depot until 1971.

Transition to museum
The Southern Railway purchased the CG in 1963 and closed the Savannah shops. Subsequently, the railway transferred the complex to the City of Savannah. The Coastal Heritage Society, a non-profit organization, opened the museum on the site in 1989.

Museum facilities
Museum attractions include:
 Massive roundhouse with an operating turntable (length )
 Numerous historic railroad buildings
 Historic machinery and stationary steam engines
 Steam and diesel 
 Office cars and cabooses.
 Daily tours and activities, sometimes including a short site tour by rail.
 Model railroad

Gallery

See also

 Central of Georgia Railway Company Shop Property
 List of National Historic Landmarks in Georgia (U.S. state)
 National Register of Historic Places listings in Chatham County, Georgia

References

External links

MLK Blvd. Visitor Information Center
Georgia State Railroad Museum - Coastal Heritage Society
Georgia Magazine page
Georgia State Railroad Museum in Savannah, Georgia - Rail Georgia.com
HawkinsRails' Georgia State Railroad Museum scrapbook

1853 establishments in Georgia (U.S. state)
Industrial buildings and structures on the National Register of Historic Places in Georgia (U.S. state)
Central of Georgia Railway
Historic American Engineering Record in Georgia (U.S. state)
Historic districts on the National Register of Historic Places in Georgia (U.S. state)
Museums established in 1989
Museums in Savannah, Georgia
National Historic Landmarks in Savannah, Georgia
National Register of Historic Places in Savannah, Georgia
Railroad museums in Georgia (U.S. state)
Railroad roundhouses in Georgia (U.S. state)
Railroad-related National Historic Landmarks
Railway workshops in the United States
Railway roundhouses on the National Register of Historic Places
Railway workshops on the National Register of Historic Places
Railway buildings and structures on the National Register of Historic Places in Georgia (U.S. state)
Blacksmith shops
Savannah Historic District